The Sonoran collared lizard (Crotaphytus nebrius) is a species of lizard in the family Crotaphytidae. The species is endemic to the U.S. state of Arizona and the Mexican state of Sonora.

Description
C. nebrius is a grayish-yellow with grayish-white spots, which are large down the middle of the body, and small on the sides.

Behavior
Adults of C. nebrius are primarily active during spring and summer; the juveniles can be active until November.

Reproduction
C. nebrius is oviparous.

References

Further reading
Axtell, Ralph W.; Montanucci, Richard R. (1977). "Crotaphytus collaris from the eastern Sonoran Desert: description of a previously unrecognized geographic race". Natural History Miscellanea, Chicago Academy of Sciences (201): 1–8. (Crotaphytus collaris nebrius, new subspecies).
McGuire, Jimmy A. (1996). "Phylogenetic Systematics of Crotaphytid Lizards (Reptilia: Iguania: Crotaphytidae)". Bulletin of Carnegie Museum of Natural History (32): iv + 1–143, 52 figures. (Crotaphytus nebrius, new combination, pp. 88-92 + Figures 31A, 34).

Lizards of North America
Sonoran Collared lizard
Reptiles of Mexico
Sonoran Collared lizard
Fauna of the Southwestern United States
Reptiles of the United States
Reptiles described in 1977